Emily Marcolini (born 12 November 1995) is a Canadian professional racing cyclist, who last rode for the UCI Women's Team  during the 2019 women's road cycling season.

Major results
2022
 6th Overall Tour of the Gila
1st Stage 5

References

External links
 

1995 births
Living people
Canadian female cyclists
Place of birth missing (living people)